The secretary of state for Scotland, also referred to as the Scottish secretary, is a secretary of state in the Government of the United Kingdom, with responsibility for the Scotland Office. The incumbent is a member of the Cabinet of the United Kingdom.

The office holder works alongside the other Scotland Office ministers. The corresponding shadow minister is the shadow secretary of state for Scotland.

The incumbent is Alister Jack, following his appointment by Prime Minister Boris Johnson in July 2019 and who was reappointed by Liz Truss and Rishi Sunak.

History

Prior to devolution (before 1999)

The post was first created after the Acts of Union 1707 created the Kingdom of Great Britain from the Kingdom of England and the Kingdom of Scotland. It was abolished in 1746, following the Jacobite rising of 1745. Scottish affairs thereafter were managed by the Lord Advocate until 1827, when responsibility passed to the Home Office. In 1885 the post of Secretary for Scotland was re-created, with the incumbent usually a member of the Cabinet. In 1926 this post was upgraded to a full Secretary of State appointment.

After devolution (since 1999)

After the 1999 Scottish devolution, the powers of the Scottish Office were divided, with most transferred to the Scottish Government or to other British government departments, leaving only a limited role for the Scotland Office. From June 2003 and October 2008, the holder of the office of Secretary of State for Scotland also held another Cabinet post concurrently, leading to claims that the Scottish role was seen as a part-time ministry.

The current secretary of state for Scotland is Alister Jack, who was appointed by Boris Johnson, replacing David Mundell. He was later reappointed by Liz Truss and Rishi Sunak.

Responsibilities
With the advent of legislative devolution for Scotland in 1999, the role of Secretary of State for Scotland was diminished. Most of the functions vested in the office since administrative devolution in the 19th century were transferred to the newly established Scottish Ministers upon the opening of the Scottish Parliament, or to other UK government ministers. However, the Secretary of State does represent Scotland in the Cabinet on matters that are not devolved to Holyrood and also holds Scotland Questions on the first Wednesday of every month between 11:30 am and 12 noon, when any Member of Parliament can ask a question on any matter relating to Scotland. However, devolved issues are not usually raised by MPs. The Secretary of State is also the group leader of the Scottish MPs from the government party.

As a result of this, the office mainly acts as a go-between for the UK and Scottish Governments and Parliaments. However, due to the Secretary's position as a minister in the British government, the convention of Cabinet collective responsibility applies, and as such the post is usually viewed as being a partisan one to promote the UK government's decision-making in Scotland, as adherence to the convention precludes doing anything else.

With the rise of the Scottish National Party (SNP) in both the Scottish Parliament and the British Parliament and the resultant interest in Scottish Independence, the Secretary of State's role has also subsequently increased in prominence. The Scotland Office itself has received a cumulative increase in budget of 20% from 2013 to 2017, with a 14.4% increase in 2015/16 alone.

The UK government's website lists the secretary of state for Scotland's responsibilities as being:
The main role of the Scottish Secretary is to promote and protect the devolution settlement.

Other responsibilities include promoting partnership between the UK Government and the Scottish Government, and relations between the 2 Parliaments.

This seeming lack of responsibility has in recent years seen calls from opposition MPs for the scrapping of the role and the Scotland Office. Robert Hazell has suggested merging the offices of Secretary of State for Northern Ireland, Scotland and Wales into one Secretary of State for the Union, in a department into which Rodney Brazier has suggested adding a Minister of State for England with responsibility for English local government.

List of Scottish secretaries

Secretaries of State for Scotland (1707–1746)

John Erskine, Earl of Mar had served as Secretary of State of the independent Scotland from 1705. Following the Acts of Union 1707, he remained in office.

The post of secretary of state for Scotland existed after the Union of the Parliament of Scotland and the Parliament of England in 1707 till the Jacobite rising of 1745. After the rising, responsibility for Scotland lay primarily with the office of the Home Secretary, usually exercised by the Lord Advocate.

Office thereafter vacant.

Secretaries for Scotland (1885–1926) 
The Secretary for Scotland was chief minister in charge of the Scottish Office in the United Kingdom government. The Scotland Office was created in 1885 with the post of Secretary for Scotland. From 1892 the Secretary for Scotland sat in cabinet. The post was upgraded to full Secretary of State rank as the Secretary of State for Scotland in 1926.

From 1885 to 1999, Secretaries for Scotland and Secretaries of State for Scotland also ex officio held the post of Keeper of the Great Seal of Scotland. From 1999, the position of Keeper of the Great Seal has been held by the First Minister of Scotland.

Secretaries of State for Scotland (1926–present)

Notes

See also
 First Minister of Scotland
 Secretary of State, a senior post in the pre-Union government of the Kingdom of Scotland
 Under-Secretary of State for Scotland, junior minister supporting the Secretary of State for Scotland
 Shadow Secretary of State for Scotland
 Secretary of State (Jacobite)
 Secretary of State for Northern Ireland
 Secretary of State for Wales

Notes

References

External links
 Official website of the Scotland Office

Scotland
Political office-holders in Scotland
Ministerial offices in the United Kingdom
 
Government ministers of the United Kingdom
1705 establishments in the British Empire
Lists of government ministers of the United Kingdom